Rooney is the debut studio album by American alternative rock band Rooney. It was released on May 27, 2003, by Geffen Records. The cover features a recreation of the flag of California. The track "Blueside" was featured in the movie of The Princess Diaries. The track "I'm a Terrible Person" was used in a commercial of Carolina Herrera's perfume. The track "I'm Shakin" was featured in the series premiere of Royal Pains and also featured in an episode of the first season of The O.C., in which the band appeared as themselves.

Critical reception

The album has received generally favorable reviews from music critics. At Metacritic, the album has received an average score of 67/100, indicating "generally favorable reviews".

Track listing
All songs written and composed by Robert Coppola Schwartzman.
"Blueside" – 3:18
"Stay Away" – 3:32
"If It Were Up to Me" – 3:00
"I'm a Terrible Person" – 2:46
"Popstars" – 4:07
"I'm Shakin'" – 3:34
"Daisy Duke" – 3:47
"Sorry Sorry" – 3:07
"That Girl Has Love" – 3:31
"Simply Because" – 4:03
"Losing All Control" – 4:19

UK edition bonus tracks
"The Floor" – 2:57
"Make Some Noise" – 4:17

Personnel
Ned Brower – backing vocals, drums
Taylor Locke – lead guitar
Robert Schwartzman – lead vocals, rhythm guitar
Louie Stephens – keyboards, piano
Matthew Winter – bass guitar

References

External links
Rooney at Discogs (list of releases)

2003 debut albums
Geffen Records albums
Rooney (band) albums
Albums produced by Jimmy Iovine
Albums produced by Keith Forsey